Siddharth Suryanarayan (born 17 April 1979), known mononymously as Siddharth, is an Indian actor who primarily works in Tamil, Telugu, and Hindi language films. Apart from acting, he has also been involved in films as a screenwriter, producer and playback singer. He has also been featured in many advertisements.

After completing his business management studies, Siddharth chose to work in film making and assisted Mani Ratnam, before going on to make an acting debut in S. Shankar's coming-of-age Tamil film Boys (2003). The success of the film provided an opportunity to feature in Mani Ratnam's multi-starrer Aayutha Ezhuthu (2004), before he branched off to receive critical and commercial acclaim in Telugu and Hindi cinema through Nuvvostanante Nenoddantana (2005), Rang De Basanti and Bommarillu (2006). In the late 2000s, he established himself as a bankable lead actor in Telugu films and subsequently chose to become more selective with his projects, while also winning acclaim for his work as a carrom player in Striker (2010) and as a blind warrior in the fantasy film Anaganaga O Dheerudu (2011).

In 2011, he returned to Tamil films after a sabbatical and produced Balaji Mohan's commercially successful romantic comedy Kadhalil Sodhappuvadhu Yeppadi (2012). The actor then had a prolific year in 2014, winning critical acclaim and box office success for his two ventures: Jigarthanda, where he portrayed an aspiring film maker, and Kaaviya Thalaivan, in which he played an actor from the 1920s Madras theater scene. After that, he acted in Sundar C 's horror comedy Aranmanai 2 (2016). Then, he acted in Malayalam film  Kammara Sambhavam (2018) written by Murali Gopy. In 2019, he has acted in two Tamil films -  Sivappu Manjal Pachai, directed by Sasi,  and Aruvam, directed by Sai Shekar.

Early life

Siddharth was born on 17 April 1979 in a Tamil-speaking family in Madras (present-day Chennai), India. He began his education at D.A.V. Boys Senior Secondary School, Madras and then studied at Sardar Patel Vidyalaya, Delhi. He subsequently graduated with a Bachelor of Commerce (Honors) degree from Kirori Mal College, New Delhi. Siddharth participated extensively in extra-curricular activities during college, serving as the president of the college's debating society and attending the World Debating Championships. He then went on to complete his MBA from S. P. Jain Institute of Management and Research, Mumbai, while also ultimately winning a speaking skills competition which earned him the CNBC Manager of the year award in 1999.

Siddharth's first tryst with media came through dubbing for the Banish mosquito repellent ad in eight different languages in 1988, as instructed by his father's close friend, ad director Jayendra. He noted that he knew he was headed for a career in films since childhood, showing particular fascination for writing and directing, and thus only signed up for business school as a "safety cushion" as insisted upon by his father. He then briefly pursued amateur theatre during his time in Delhi through live stage performances with the theatre group Players, while also honing his writing and directorial skills.

Film career

2001–05: Debut and critical acclaim
After finishing his education, he apprenticed with ad film maker Jayendra and cinematographer P. C. Sreeram, who both helped him join as an assistant director for Mani Ratnam's Kannathil Muthamittal. He worked on the film throughout 2001, also making an uncredited appearance as a passenger on a bus. The script writer of that film, Sujatha, was insistent that Siddharth audition for Shankar's ongoing project Boys (2003), where the director had hoped to cast new actors. After consulting with Mani Ratnam, Siddharth met Shankar for an audition and was signed on the following day to play the lead role of Munna. Siddharth shot for the film in 2002 alongside fellow debutants Genelia D'Souza, Bharath, Nakul, Thaman and Manikandan, while also suffering an injury which led to him being hospitalised for three days. The story centred on six youngsters, conveying a message about the importance of a good education and career over other distractions, such as romance and sex, and marked a move away from Shankar's usual brand of vigilante films, gaining much hype and publicity prior to release. The film opened to mixed reviews but emerged as a success at the box office, with reviewers noting the ensemble cast as "excellent". Before the release of Boys, Siddharth signed on to feature in his mentor Mani Ratnam's political drama film, Aayutha Ezhuthu (2004) where he played the student Arjun Balakrishnan, a role which he described was similar to his real life persona. Featuring in an ensemble cast including Madhavan, Suriya and Trisha, Siddharth revealed that the sync sound method of filming that the team had employed, worked in his favour, as he was able to draw experience from his stage performances. The film was released in May 2004 to positive reviews, with a critic from The Hindu noting Siddharth's portrayal as "neat", while another reviewer noted that Siddharth "is cool and discovers his comic side with some great one-liners."

Siddharth then ventured into Telugu films by signing on to appear in Prabhu Deva's first directorial project, the romantic drama Nuvvostanante Nenoddantana (2005) in which he was again paired alongside Trisha. Portraying the NRI youngster Santhosh, Siddharth revealed he worked hard to depict his character as "hyperactive, and unpredictable, to the point that the audience does not know what to expect from him" in order to differentiate the role from other NRI depictions in Indian films. He also was insistent that he dubbed for himself and learned the Telugu language during the making of the film. The film released in January 2005 to widespread critical acclaim, with several critics dubbing it a "must-see". A reviewer from Idlebrain.com noted Siddharth is "the surprise package" of the film, adding "he epitomized the essence of his character and won the hearts of audiences with his zest portrayal of mischievous yet lovable guy". Similarly Sify.com added "the surprise packet is Siddharth as the hyperactive, young man and he is just a riot". The film consequently went on to become an all-time blockbuster in the Telugu film industry, and Siddharth became a much sought after actor in Telugu films. The film also dominated award ceremonies the following year, with his performance fetching him his first Filmfare Award for Best Actor – Telugu for his portrayal of Santhosh. He then wrote the story and worked on the screenplay for his next release, the Telugu film Chukkallo Chandrudu (2006) directed by Sivakumar, also being credited as a playback singer for the first time. Described as a "sophisticated comedy film for multiplex crowds", it opened to mixed reviews with Siddharth's contribution described as a "redeeming factor", but failed at the box office.

2006–10: Career in Telugu and Hindi cinema
The success of Nuvvostanante Nenoddantana saw Siddharth shift base to Hyderabad and pursue a career primarily in Telugu films, and was non-committal about taking up films in other languages. After rejecting an initial approach by Rakeysh Omprakash Mehra's team, he later agreed to work on the drama film Rang De Basanti (2006) after being impressed upon reading the film's script. He was further attracted to the offer through the opportunity of working with Aamir Khan as well as by the film's ensemble cast of Madhavan, Sharman Joshi, Kunal Kapoor and Soha Ali Khan. The film tells the story of an incident of government corruption radicalising a group of friends from being carefree to passion-driven individuals. Rang De Basanti opened in January 2006 to positive reviews and went on to become a super-hit at the box office. It was chosen as India's official entry for the Golden Globe Awards and the Academy Award for Best Foreign Language Film category, while also winning the National Film Award for Best Popular Film Providing Wholesome Entertainment and the Filmfare Award for Best Film. Portraying an angry, young man named Karan Singhania, Siddharth's performance was highly appreciated by critics, who stated he was "excellent". He received nominations for Best Supporting Actor and Best Male Debut at the Filmfare, IIFA and Zee Cine Awards.

Siddharth's next release was the Telugu family drama Bommarillu (2006), directed by Bhaskar. The film portrayed the relationship between a father and son, in which the father's excessive concern for his son, and interference in his life, leads to the latter harbouring bitterness towards his overbearing father. Cast opposite Genelia for the second time, Bhaskar revealed he chose Siddharth to play the lead role because of his similarities in body language with the character. During the shoot, the director praised the actor's versatility and dedication to the role, adding he was "mesmerised" after Siddharth performed a scene close to four minutes without a cut. Upon release in August 2006, several critics gave the film an "instant classic" status, with Idlebrain.com noting it was "picture-perfect". The lead pair won widespread critical acclaim for their performances and chemistry, with a reviewer from Sify.com stating that it was "another tailor-made role for Siddharth. He is very natural, charming and elegant" and he "melds effortlessly from a casual sangfroid to utter seriousness". Bommarillu emerged as a blockbuster at the domestic box-office, in addition to becoming the highest-grossing Telugu film internationally at the time of its release. His performance in the film earned him his second nomination for the Filmfare Award for Best Actor – Telugu. He then worked with director Vishal Bhardwaj and cinematographer Guillermo Navarro on a short film titled Blood Brothers, which premiered at the 2007 Toronto International Film Festival as part of Mira Nair's AIDS Jaago project. His next release was Aata (2007), an action drama film alongside Ileana D'Cruz, which received mixed reviews from critics. Following this, Siddharth chose to become cautious about his future ventures, revealing he "rather achieve with one good film at a time, as opposed to a barrage of mediocrity" and rejected a series of offers in Hindi and Telugu films.

Siddharth then went twenty months without a film release, taking a sabbatical and then working extensively on the making of his second Hindi film. He had two Telugu films which released in 2009, with the family drama Konchem Ishtam Konchem Kashtam opposite Tamannaah receiving positive reviews from critics and audiences. Anand Ranga's Oye!, saw Siddharth appear in another role as a romantic hero and paired opposite actress Shamili, while he also contributed as the film's soundtrack album producer working with Yuvan Shankar Raja. The film opened to mixed reviews and had an average run at the box office, with a critic noting "Siddharth has given a brilliant performance as a lover boy, but his acting is not up to the mark in some emotional scenes". His second Hindi film, Striker (2010), was a period drama set in the 1990s portraying the life of a carrom player. Siddharth became extensively involved with the making of the film and in order to adapt into the role, he took training in the sport for two months and relocated to the Malwani district in Mumbai. Prior to release, Siddharth noted that his career as an actor in Hindi films would depend on how well the film is received and contemplated relocating his base to Mumbai. Striker became the first Indian film to be released in theatres and on YouTube on the same day, but failed to do well at the box office. However, Siddharth won positive reviews for his performance with a critic from Rediff.com noting that "this is a Siddharth vehicle from start to finish" and that "to his credit, he channelises his spontaneous presence to slip nimbly under the skin of a carrom genius, shifting his body language from a concentrating player to a smooth-talking, snarky lad entangled in a web of crime with restraint and conviction." His other release that year was the Telugu film Baava, a romantic family entertainer, which he accepted because it would show him in the different light of a village-based character. The film opened to negative reviews, with an industry pundit noting the film was "another misplaced attempt for a break" for the actor.

2011–13: Career fluctuations

The actor was then selected to portray the lead role of a blind warrior in Prakash Kovelamudi's fantasy epic Anaganaga O Dheerudu co-produced by Walt Disney Pictures and veteran director K. Raghavendra Rao. Beginning production in June 2009, it became the actor's most expensive film till date and marked the debuts of actresses Shruti Haasan and Lakshmi Manchu in Telugu cinema. The film opened with high expectations following positive pre-release promotions, but only garnered average collections and reviews from critics. While a critic from Rediff.com noted Siddharth "shines in his first true-blue action film" and that "he displays quick reflexes, agility, and keenness as the swordsman", another reviewer was more critical, stating that Siddharth "tried his best to get into the shoes of a warrior, the attire does not suit him and he displayed much innocence on his face, rendering the show a pale drama." He was next seen in the Tamil and Telugu bilingual 180 directed by his mentor, the ad director Jayendra. The venture marked his return to Tamil films after a seven-year hiatus, and he was seen portraying a doctor who flees from his American life to begin fresh in India. The film had an average run at the box office, though garnered positive reviews from critics. His third release of the year was the romantic college drama, Oh My Friend co-starring Shruti Haasan and Hansika Motwani, which opened to mixed reviews but proved to be a commercial success at the box office.

Siddharth then chose to produce his first film under his newly launched production studio, Etaki Entertainment Private Limited, which he had registered in October 2010. He financed the bilingual college romantic comedy Kadhalil Sodhappuvadhu Yeppadi (2012), based on the same-titled short film by Balaji Mohan, and featured in the lead role alongside Amala Paul. He revealed that after watching the 10-minute Tamil short film, he found it interesting and developed an interest to turn it into a mainstream full-length feature film. The film was shot in Tamil and Telugu over a period of eight months under a moderate budget. The film opened in February 2012 in both languages to commercial success, becoming a profitable venture at the box office. Both the film and Siddharth won positive reviews, with a critic calling it "earnest" and "well-written". In 2013, Siddharth had his most prolific year and appeared in seven film across four languages. Siddharth was selected to be a part of the ensemble cast for Deepa Mehta's Midnight's Children, a 2012 British-Canadian film adaptation of Salman Rushdie's 1981 novel of the same name. He sped read the book to prepare for his role and attended a series of workshops to portray the role of Shiva, earning positive reviews for his performance. Siddharth then worked on Nandini Reddy's Telugu romantic comedy Jabardasth opposite Samantha, with the pair portraying wedding planners. Despite hype prior to release, as a result of the pair's off-screen relationship, the film garnered poor reviews with critics noting their characters "were poorly written". The film became a commercial failure, while also becoming entangled in a legal tussle soon after release of story theft. He also was subsequently seen in Srinu Vaitla's Baadshah, performing a guest appearance in a flashback sequence. His fourth release was David Dhawan's Hindi comedy film Chashme Baddoor, a remake of the 1981 film of the same name, which received negative reviews from critics. Next, Siddharth collaborated with debutant director Manimaran for the romantic thriller Udhayam NH4, written by Vetrimaaran. The film won positive reviews and performed strongly at the box office, with a critic from Rediff.com adding the actor "has given a very mature, yet understated performance". He then featured in Sundar C's commercially successful Tamil comedy film Theeya Velai Seiyyanum Kumaru portraying a timid IT employee who seeks the help of a love guru. His popularity in Telugu cinema meant that the makers shot the film in Telugu as Something Something.

2014–2016: Comeback to Tamil cinema
By early 2014, Siddharth worked simultaneously on three Tamil projects claiming in an interview to The Hindu newspaper that the year was likely to "be a turning point in his career". His first release of the year was Karthik Subbaraj's musical gangster film Jigarthanda, where he portrayed an aspiring film director who travels to Madurai to make a film based on the life and times of a notorious rowdy. Siddharth was chosen by the director as "he had not done a role like it before", and his on screen character was named after and drew allusions to Karthik Subbaraj's career as a filmmaker. Co-starring Bobby Simha as the rowdy and Lakshmi Menon, Jigarthanda opened to positive reviews in August 2014. Reviewers noted Siddharth "gives a commendable performance" and that he "was simply terrific in the scenes where he plays a cat and mouse game with the gangster". The film subsequently went on to become among the most profitable Tamil films of the year, while earning "cult status" amongst the audience. The success of the film meant that Siddharth had four successive commercially successful films in Tamil and was at the peak of his career in the industry.

His next release was Vasanthabalan's historical fiction film, Kaaviya Thalaivan, depicting the life of performers from the Madras theatre circuit from the 1920s. Siddharth was associated with the project right from the scripting stages in 2011, and was instrumental in helping bring the producers and A. R. Rahman become a part of the venture. Working alongside Prithviraj and Vedhika, he portrayed the leading role of Thalaivankottai "Kaali"appa Bhagavathar, a Madras theatre artiste, loosely based on the life of actor S. G. Kittappa. To prepare for the role, he studied the work of actors from the 1920s and made himself familiar with the lives of artistes from that time period, noting his stint in theatre was helpful. The film opened to unanimously positive reviews in November 2014, with Siddharth's performance receiving critical acclaim. A reviewer from Rediff.com noted "This is a role of a lifetime for Siddharth, a truly memorable performance. He sports innumerable looks in the film and is perfect in every one of them, totally at ease with the character and the body language", while Sify.com added "he has done a magnificent job and his eyes speak the sadness of his character." His performance in the film earned him his first nomination for the Filmfare Award for Best Actor – Tamil. Siddharth's next on-screen appearance was in Enakkul Oruvan (2015), a remake of the successful Kannada film Lucia (2013), which was produced by C. V. Kumar. Appearing in two roles as a successful actor and as a village theatre operator, Siddharth appeared in one sporting a dark complexion for the first time. The film opened to positive reviews, with a critic from Sify.com stating that Siddharth does "an extraordinary job of sinking his teeth into the two characters with consummate ease", adding that the film was a "bold and unique attempt with sharp performances and a tight script". Similarly, a reviewer from Behindwoods.com stated he gave "a neat and apt enactment" in the two roles. However both Kaaviya Thalaivan and Enakkul Oruvan failed commercially at the box office, prompting the actor to take a break from films. After a six-month sabbatical, Siddharth announced that he had finished work on another acting and production venture, Jil Jung Juk by newcomer Deeraj Vaidy. He has also worked on Sundar C's horror comedy, Aranmanai 2 alongside Trisha and Hansika Motwani. Furthermore, Siddharth has signed on to appear in a Malayalam film directed by ad film maker Rathish Ambat in his feature film debut.

2017–present: Further career
After a series of template horror-comedy films, Siddharth and Milind Rau have come up with Aval, a smartly made thriller mixed with emotions. The script is considered to be based on a real-life incident. Apart from producing and acting, Siddharth has also co-written the movie with Milind Rau. The film was made as a bilingual in Hindi (titled The House Next Door) and dubbed in Telugu as Gruham. In 2018, he appears in his first film Malayalam, Kammara Sambhavam. In 2019, he acted in Hindi TV series Leila. The series was short with one season and 6 episodes, appearing on the Netflix site. In September 2019, Sasi's Sivappu Manjal Pachai. GV Prakash Kumar is a street racer while Rajasekar (Siddharth) is a traffic cop.  Siddharth sheds his ‘chocolate boy’ image to play an astute, hyper-masculine. The film was released to positive reviews. And October 2019, Aruvam, a supernatural thriller film which received mixed reviews. Siddharth next signed Ajay Bhupathi's Telugu film Maha Samudram. He starred alongside Sharwanand. The film released on 14 October 2021 in theatres to negative reviews.

Other work 
Siddharth has also been featured in many advertisements. As he actively worked in both Hindi and South Indian film industry, Parle Agro signed him as a nation-wide brand ambassador in 2012 owing to his pan-Indian appeal.

Personal life
Siddharth married Meghna in November 2003, after the pair had fallen in love growing up in the same neighbourhood in New Delhi. However, by early 2006, the pair were living separately, and later divorced in January 2007.

Filmography

Film

Voice artist

Television

Discography

Playback singer

Awards

References

External links

 
 

1979 births
Living people
Indian male film actors
Kirori Mal College alumni
Tamil male actors
Male actors in Telugu cinema
Telugu playback singers
S. P. Jain Institute of Management and Research alumni
Filmfare Awards South winners
Screen Awards winners
Tamil playback singers
Indian male playback singers
Male actors from Chennai
Male actors in Malayalam cinema
Male actors in Tamil cinema
Male actors in Hindi cinema
21st-century Indian male actors
Tamil film producers
Telugu film producers
Hindi film producers
Film producers from Chennai
Singers from Chennai